La strega in amore (also known as The Witch, The Witch in Love and Strange Obsession) is a 1966 Italian drama-horror film directed by Damiano Damiani. It is based on the novel Aura by Carlos Fuentes.

Cast 
 Richard Johnson: Sergio
 Rosanna Schiaffino: Aura
 Gian Maria Volonté: Fabrizio
 Sarah Ferrati: Consuelo
 Margherita Guzzinati: Lorna
 Ivan Rassimov: the librarian

Release
La strega in amore was released on September 11, 1966 in Italy where it was distributed by Cidif. The film grossed a total of 203,396,000 Italian lira domestically. It was released in the United States in August 1969 where it was distributed by G.G. Productions.

Notes

References

External links
 

1966 films
Italian drama films
Films directed by Damiano Damiani
1966 drama films
Italian horror films
1966 horror films
Films based on Mexican novels
Films scored by Luis Bacalov
Films about witchcraft
1960s Italian films